Dennis Patrick Lamp (born September 23, 1952) is a former professional baseball pitcher in Major League Baseball. From 1977 through 1992, the breaking ball specialist played for the Chicago Cubs, Chicago White Sox, Toronto Blue Jays, Oakland Athletics, Boston Red Sox, and Pittsburgh Pirates.

Career
Lamp was born in Los Angeles, California. Lamp was selected in the third round (62nd overall) by the Cubs in that year's MLB Draft. After graduating from St. John Bosco High School in Bellflower, California in 1971,

Lamp began his career as a Cub, but was traded to the crosstown Chicago White Sox for pitcher Ken Kravec. His seven wins and 15 saves helped the White Sox win their division by a whopping 20 games and reach the ALCS. A month later, he was granted free agency and signed with the Toronto Blue Jays.

In a 14-season career, Lamp posted a 96-96 record with a 3.93 ERA and 35 saves in 639 games pitched. His best season was 1985 when he went 11-0 with a 3.32 ERA in 105 innings pitched. In 1984 with the Blue Jays, Lamp came up just one win short of Luis Arroyo's 1961 record for most consecutive wins by a reliever.

He continued to pitch while approaching his 40th birthday, coming out of the bullpen in 21 games for the 1992 Pittsburgh Pirates, who won their division and advanced to the NLCS, but he was released in June of that season.

Lamp was involved in two individual career milestones involving a pair of future Baseball Hall of Famers. On August 13, 1979, he gave up Lou Brock's 3,000th hit. He also surrendered Cal Ripken Jr.'s first major-league hit, a third-inning infield single in the White Sox's 8–7 victory over the Baltimore Orioles at Memorial Stadium on August 16, 1981.

Post season appearances
Lamp has pitched in the ALCS on three occasions: 1983 with the White Sox, 1985 with the Blue Jays, and 1990 with the Red Sox.

Life after baseball
Lamp has worked behind the seafood counter at Bristol Farms in Newport Beach, California since 2004.

References

External links
 or Dennis Lamp at Baseballbiography.com or The Baseball Page or Baseball Almanac

1952 births
Living people
American expatriate baseball players in Canada
Baseball players from Los Angeles
Boston Red Sox players
Buffalo Bisons (minor league) players
Caldwell Cubs players
Chicago Cubs players
Chicago White Sox players
Key West Conchs players
Major League Baseball pitchers
Midland Cubs players
Oakland Athletics players
Pittsburgh Pirates players
Quincy Cubs players
Toronto Blue Jays players
Wichita Aeros players